Simpang Pertang (Jawi: سيمڤڠ ڤرتڠ) is a small town in Jelebu District, Negeri Sembilan, Malaysia. It is a few kilometres away from the town of Pertang, which the intersection is named after.

It is most well known as the intersection of federal routes 9, which leads to Karak and Kuala Pilah and 86, which leads to Kuala Klawang, Pantai and ultimately Seremban.

References

Jelebu District
Towns in Negeri Sembilan